A footprint is an impression left by a foot or shoe.

Foot print, footprint or footprints may also refer to:

Places
 Footprints Bay, bay on Ambergris Caye, Belize
 Footprint Nebula, also known as M1-92

Science and technology

 Carbon footprint, the carbon dioxide released by a human activity into the atmosphere
 Digital footprint, or digital shadow, one's unique set of traceable digital activities on the Internet or digital devices
 Ecological footprint, the environmental impact of a human activity, machine, etc.
 Footprint (electronics), the layout of electronic connections on a printed circuit board
 Footprint (satellite), the area of the Earth's surface from which a satellite's signals can be received
 Footprinting, the technique of gathering information about computer systems
 Memory footprint, the amount of memory a computer program uses

Arts, entertainment, and media

Literature
 "Footprints" (poem), a popular allegorical poem and poster
 Footprints on Sand, 1981 collection by authors L. Sprague de Camp and Catherine Crook de Camp

Music

Albums
 Footprint (album), by Gary Wright
 Footprints (album), by Holly Valance
 Footprints (Pat Martino album)
 Footprints (Tuks Senganga album)
 Footprints, an album by Karrin Allyson

Songs and compositions
 "Footprints" (composition), a jazz standard by Wayne Shorter
 Footprints (Paul McCartney song)
 Footprints (Róisín Murphy song)
 "Foot Prints", a song by Yes from the album Keys to Ascension 2
 "Footprints", a song by G-Unit from the album Beg for Mercy
 "Footprints", a song by Half Man Half Biscuit on the 1993 album This Leaden Pall
 "Footprints", a song from Sia Furler's 2016 album This Is Acting
 "Footprints", a song from Squeeze's 1987 album Babylon and On
 "Footprints", a song from Tom Gregory's 2021 album Things I Can't Say Out Loud
 "Footprints", a song by A Tribe Called Quest from the album People's Instinctive Travels and the Paths of Rhythm

Other uses in arts, entertainment, and media
 Footprint Center, sports and entertainment arena in Phoenix, Arizona, US
 Footprint Films (Australia), Australian film distributor
 Footprint Films (UK), British film production company, producer of Escape from Pretoria
 Footprints (film), a 2011 film

Enterprises and organizations
 Citizens' Footprint Movement, political party in Colombia
 Footprint Books, a travel publisher based in Bath, UK, that covers Latin America
 Footprint (company), a company based in Gilbert, Arizona, US, that makes biodegradable packaging materials

Others
Footprint (tent), groundsheet protector

See also

 Buddha footprint, an early aniconic and symbolic representation of the Buddha
 Devil's Footprints, mysterious footprints in snow in Devon, England in 1855
 Fossil track, a fossilized footprint
 Laetoli footprints, prehistoric footprints near Laetoli, Tanzania
 Moso's Footprint, formation in Samoa